Albert Payne (26 June 1885 – 7 May 1908) was an English cricketer. Payne was a right-handed batsman who fielded as a wicket-keeper. He was born at Leicester, Leicestershire.

Payne made his first-class debut for Leicestershire against the touring West Indians in 1906 at Aylestone Road, Leicester. He made four further first-class appearances, the last of which came against Lancashire at Whitegate Park, Blackpool. In his five first-class matches, he scored a total of 15 runs at an average of 2.50, with a high score of 7 not out. Behind the stumps he took six catches and made a single stumping.

His died from tuberculosis at the town of his birth on 7 May 1908. His obituary in the 1909 Wisden Cricketers' Almanack erroneously puts his name as Alfred Payne.

References

External links
Albert Payne at ESPNcricinfo
Albert Payne at CricketArchive

1885 births
1908 deaths
Cricketers from Leicester
English cricketers
Leicestershire cricketers
20th-century deaths from tuberculosis
Tuberculosis deaths in England
Wicket-keepers